The Ring Finger is a French film released on 8 June 2005. It was written (based on a novel by Yōko Ogawa) and directed by Diane Bertrand.

Plot
Iris (Olga Kurylenko) is a young woman working in a bottle washing factory. She loses the tip of her ring finger in an accident at work and leaves her job. She moves to a nearby port city and comes across a job working for a strange laboratory at which people have "specimens" preserved.

Cast
Olga Kurylenko as Iris
Marc Barbé as The laboratory man
Stipe Erceg as The sailor
Édith Scob as The Lady of the 223
Hanns Zischler as The hotel owner
Sotigui Kouyaté as The Shoe shine
Anne Benoît as The score lady 
Doria Achour as The mushrooms girl
Louis Dewynter as The kid
Anne Fassio as Madame Ryen
Olivier Claverie as Monsieur Ryen

References

External links

2005 films
Films directed by Diane Bertrand
Films based on Japanese novels
French drama films
German drama films
British drama films
2000s British films
2000s French films
2000s German films